Tubo (Chinese: 土伯; pinyin: Tǔbó) in Chinese mythology is the warden of Youdu, the capital of Hell. He is a vassal under Houtu, but some scholars also suggest that he was the primordial overlord of the Diyu.

Body
According to Chu Ci Zhao Hun (楚辞·招魂), Tubo has a tiger head, a cow body, three bulging eyes, a pair of sharp horns, a pair of blood-stained hands that banishes the poor ghost and regard people as delicious food.

In other regions

Sichuan
In Sichuan mythology, Tubo is the first Emperor of Ghost (鬼帝). In ancient times Sichuan Basin was resided by two different ethnic groups, Ba people and Shu people. With the continuous exchanges in terms of religion, culture and ideologies, some common beliefs and identities were formed and shared. And Tubo is one of such common gods worshiped by both ethinic groups, as the first Emperor of Ghost. Some historians argue that Tubo was a tribe leader of the Ba peple, because in Eastern Zhou dynasty, Youdu where Tubo lives was the capital of Ba (state), while the some tribes of the Ba people were called Gui Zu (鬼族, Ghost clan).

Hubei, Hunan

In Eastern Zhou, people of Chu made sculptures of Tubo, and put them into graves as Zhen Mu Shou(镇墓兽), which are monster sculptures to soothe the soul of the deceased while protecting it from wandering ghost. The sculptures were usually made of wood and brass, and antlers were often used. Most such sculptures are found in Chu graves belong to scholar-bureaucrat class who followed Wu Shamanism (巫觋). They usually believe that Zhen Mu Shou could bring their spirit to the Tian Jie and thus become immortal. 

Although the faces of the existing monster sculptures are mostly obscure, other characteristics such as sharp horns, curved body, bulging eyes, ghostly expression, and close link to the underworld all bear remarkable similarity to descriptions of Tubo in historical texts.

In Popular Culture
In the popular Chinese webfiction Mu Shen Ji (牧神记), Tubo is the incarnation of the Tao of the underworld (幽都大道). The unbreakability of the Tubo Contract (土伯之约) derives power from his horns.

See also
 楚式镇墓兽

References

Further reading 
牧神记

Underworld gods
Chinese gods
Death gods
Mythological creatures
Chinese mythology